(Pyruvate, phosphate dikinase) kinase (PPDK regulatory protein, pyruvate, phosphate dikinase regulatory protein, bifunctional dikinase regulatory protein) is an enzyme with systematic name ADP:(pyruvate, phosphate dikinase) phosphotransferase. This enzyme catalyses the following chemical reaction

 ADP + [pyruvate, phosphate dikinase]  AMP + [pyruvate, phosphate dikinase] phosphate

This enzyme is isolated from the plants Zea mays (maize) and arabidopsis.

References

External links 
 

EC 2.7.11